Bass Desires is a studio album by jazz acoustic bassist Marc Johnson released in 1985 on the ECM label. It features guitarists Bill Frisell and John Scofield, and former Weather Report drummer Peter Erskine. The same group would record Johnson's next album under the group name “Marc Johnson's Bass Desires”.

Reception
The Allmusic review by Michael G. Nastos awarded the album 4½ stars, stating, "The pairing of electric guitarists Bill Frisell and John Scofield had to be one of the most auspicious since John McLaughlin and Carlos Santana. Acoustic bassist Marc Johnson's stroke of genius in bringing the two together on Bass Desires resulted in a sound that demonstrated both compatibility between the guitarists and the distinctiveness of the two when heard in combination... this debut has stood the test of time -- it is priceless, timeless, and still far from being dated".

Track listing
 "Samurai Hee-Haw" (Johnson) - 7:44
 "Resolution" (Coltrane) - 10:31
"Black Is the Color of My True Love's Hair" (Traditional) - 7:09
"Bass Desires" (Erskine) - 6:12
"A Wishing Doll" (Bernstein, David) - 6:16
"Mojo Highway" (Johnson) - 8:44
"Thanks Again" (Scofield) - 7:15

Personnel
Marc Johnson – bass
Bill Frisell – guitar, guitar synthesizer
John Scofield – guitar
Peter Erskine – drums

References 

1985 albums
ECM Records albums
Marc Johnson (musician) albums